St Thomas' Church, Plaistow was a Church of England church on Northern Road in Plaistow, Newham. It opened in 1898 as a mission church of St Mary's Church, Plaistow. It was demolished around 1950.

References

St Thomas'
St Thomas'
Former churches in London
Former Church of England church buildings
Church of England church buildings in Plaistow
19th-century Church of England church buildings
Demolished buildings and structures in London